Chiasmocleis bassleri is a species of frog in the family Microhylidae. It is found in the Amazon biome of Brazil, Colombia, Ecuador, Peru, and Bolivia. The specific name bassleri honors Harvey Bassler, an American geologist and paleontologist. Common name Bassler's humming frog has been proposed for this species.

Description
Male frogs can be heard calling from under wet leaf litter, near pond edges. The call consists of many sporadically emitted, short multi-pulsed notes (3–6 pulses).

Habitat
Chiasmocleis bassleri is an abundant and widespread species in suitable habitats. It is found in terra firma primary and secondary tropical rainforest and in seasonally flooded forest. They usually occur near isolated pools, hiding under leaves or pieces of bark.

Chiasmocleis bassleri is adversely impacted by habitat loss due to forest clearing.

References

bassleri
Amphibians of Bolivia
Amphibians of Brazil
Amphibians of Colombia
Amphibians of Ecuador
Amphibians of Peru
Amphibians described in 1949
Taxa named by Emmett Reid Dunn
Taxonomy articles created by Polbot